The Other Side is a 2000 Spanish drama film written and directed by  and based on the novel by Elvira Lindo. It stars Àlex Casanovas and Jorge Alcázar.

Plot 
Set in Vallecas, the plot follows the vicissitudes of Ramón, a chubby teenager who is involved in a combo of tragedies, unwillingly slicing the jugular of his best friend with the edge of a cockle can, prompting the latter's girlfriend's death by fall from balcony, and ensuing death of another neighbor. While the criminal investigation tries to shed light on the matter, Ramon is taken to a children's home. Via the contact established by Ramón's sister Gloria, Ramón is provided help by Marcelo, a lawyer raised in the hood who has returned to Madrid from Barcelona.

Cast

Production 
García Ruiz's sophomore feature after Mensaka, The Other Side is based on the novel El otro barrio by Elvira Lindo. Shooting locations included Vallecas.

Release 
The film screened at the 48th San Sebastián International Film Festival in September 2000. Distributed by Alta Films, it was theatrically released in Spain on 11 October 2000. Wild Bunch scooped the international distribution rights.

Reception 
David Rooney of Variety considered that García Ruiz delivers "a dense, intimate drama that avoids all the cliches of the problem-teen genre and instead creates an affecting, acutely observed portrait of people in a specific but universally recognizable social milieu", otherwise deeming the psychological drama to be "too subtle" for wide commercial coverage.

José María Caparrós Lera highlights the film's "extreme callousness and narrative classicism" as its hallmarks.

Ángel Fernández-Santos of El País considered the film to be bold yet unbalanced, assessing that the script is not "well-constructed" nor "calculated", but quite the opposite, with the sketch of the lawyer suffering from inaccuracies that imperil the film's formal framework.

Accolades 

|-
| rowspan = "3" align = "center" | 2001 || 15th Goya Awards || Best Adapted Screenplay || Salvador García Ruiz ||  || 
|-
| rowspan = "2" | 10th Actors Union Awards || Best Secondary Performance in a Film || Pepa Pedroche ||  || rowspan = "2" | 
|-
| Best Minor Performance in a Film || Guillermo Toledo || 
|}

See also 
 List of Spanish films of 2000

References 

2000s Spanish films
2000s Spanish-language films
2000 drama films
Films based on Spanish novels
Spanish drama films
Films set in Madrid
Films shot in Madrid
Tornasol Films films